Pleioptygma helenae is a species of sea snail, a marine gastropod mollusk in the family Pleioptygmatidae.

It is the only known living species in this genus and the only extant species in the family Pleioptygmatidae.

Distribution
Honduras.

The type locality is Gorda Bank, Honduras.

Fossil record from Neogene include southeastern USA.

Description 
The maximum recorded shell length is 123 mm.

The anatomy of the family Pleioptygmatidae is defined according to this the only extant species.

Habitat 
Minimum recorded depth is 37 m. Maximum recorded depth is 150 m.

References

Further reading 
 Quinn J. F. Jr. & Lyons W. G. (1984). "A partial description of the anatomy of Pleioptygma helenae (Gastropoda: Neogastropoda)". American Malacological Bulletin 3(1): 97-98.

External links

Pleioptygmatidae
Gastropods described in 1972